is a Japanese four-panel manga series written by Yu Aikawa and illustrated by Akiwo Yasaka, serialized online via Ichijinsha's Zero-Sum Online website since June 2016. It has been collected in twelve tankōbon volumes. An anime television series adaptation by Saetta premiered from October 2 to December 18, 2018.

Plot
Tomari Hinowa is a normal high school boy, until one day he's told that he has to become the wife of a mysterious creature called Kanenogi. This is the start of their newly married life.

Characters

Humans

A high schooler living alone who becomes Kanenogi's wife. He's hesitant at first about his marriage to Kanenogi, but starts to warm up to them.

The student council president and wife to both Roku and Nano.

Creatures

A large, fluffy creature and Tomari's husband. It likes to gently chew on Tomari's head and eat concrete.

A small, pink creature and Sora's husband. It is sensitive about its hair growth and will get angry if anyone tries to remove its hat.

A bandage creature and Mokusaibashi's husband. It can communicate through writing on paper and can control its bandages.
 and 

A pair of one-eyed and one-winged twins and Tetsukasa's husbands. Roku has dark purple hair, while Nana's hair is light purple. They only eat food additives.

Media

Manga

|}

Anime

References

External links
 
 

Anime series based on manga
Ichijinsha manga
Japanese webcomics
Josei manga
Webcomics in print
Yonkoma